The Windermere Ferry is a vehicular cable ferry which crosses Windermere, a lake in the English county of Cumbria. The ferry is owned and operated by Cumbria County Council.

The ferry operates all year, with services every 20 minutes from early morning to mid-evening. Each crossing can carry up to 18 cars and over 100 passengers and takes less than 10 minutes. A toll is charged. If the ferry is not operating, the alternative is a road journey of approximately  around either the head or foot of the lake.

History

There has been a ferry at the site of the current Windermere Ferry for more than 500 years, with the earliest craft being rowed across the lake. During this period there was one recorded disaster, in 1635, when the ferry capsized and forty-seven people perished. The first cable ferry, powered by steam, commenced operation in 1870. New ferry boats were introduced to the route in 1915 and 1954, when a boat named Drake was introduced. 

The current ferry boat, named Mallard, was built in 1990 and can carry up to 18 cars and over 100 passengers. The ferry underwent its most recent five-yearly refit and full inspection in March 2019. The previous refit in 2014 cost £300,000 and involved rebuilding the engines and servicing all hydraulic, mechanical and electrical systems on the ferry, together with a full repaint.

On 26 May 2018, the Mallard suffered an engine room fire which disabled the ferry during a crossing. One of the local cruise boats provided emergency assistance and took the passengers on board. Whilst the ferry was out of action, Cumbria County Council arranged for Windermere Lake Cruises to continue a reduced pedestrian crossing over the lake. The Mallard returned to service on 27 October after having been repaired and fitted with a new engine.

References

External links
 
 Cumbria County Council web page on the ferry
 Webcam of western terminal

Chain ferries in the United Kingdom
Ferry transport in England
Transport in Cumbria
Windermere, Cumbria